The 1917 Southwestern Louisiana Industrial football team was an American football team that represented the Southwestern Louisiana Industrial Institute (now known as the University of Louisiana at Lafayette) as a member of the Louisiana Intercollegiate Athletic Association (LIAA) during the 1917 college football season. In their sixth year under head coach Clement J. McNaspy, the team compiled an overall record of 8–2.

Schedule

References

Southwestern Louisiana
Louisiana Ragin' Cajuns football seasons
Southwestern Louisiana Industrial football